Leslie Roy Cunningham (October 4, 1913 – April 9, 1993) was a Canadian ice hockey player. He played 60 games in the National Hockey League with the New York Americans and Chicago Black Hawks between 1936 and 1940. The rest of his career, which lasted from 1933 to 1949, was mainly spent in the American Hockey League. The American Hockey League presents the Les Cunningham Award annually to its league MVP. Cunningham was born in Calgary, Alberta.

Career statistics

Regular season and playoffs

External links
 
AHL Hall of Fame Bio

1913 births
1993 deaths
Buffalo Bisons (IHL) players
Canadian ice hockey centres
Chicago Blackhawks players
Cleveland Falcons players
Cleveland Barons (1937–1973) players
New York Americans players
Regina Pats players
San Francisco Shamrocks (PCHL) players
Ice hockey people from Calgary